There are a number of environmental issues in Florida. A large portion of Florida is a biologically diverse ecosystem, with large wetlands in the Everglades. Management of environmental issues related to the everglades and the larger coastal waters and wetlands have been important to the history of Florida and the development of multiple parts of the economy of Florida, including the influential agricultural industry. This biodiversity leaves much of Florida's ecological ecosystem vulnerable to invasive species and human sources of industrial pollution and waste.

Moreover, because of Florida's low geography, Florida has been described as "ground zero" in the United States for the impacts of climate change in the United States.

Everglades

The Everglades are tropical wetlands located in the southern portion of Florida that have been designated under the Ramsar Convention as one of only three wetland areas of global importance. A restoration of the Everglades is being carried out with a $7.8 billion, 30-year project aimed at its preservation and restoration.

Biodiversity
The Florida panther is an endangered population of the cougar (Puma concolor). There are about 230  individuals in the wild. The Center for Biological Diversity and others have called for a special protected area for the panther.

Manatees are also dying at a rate much higher than their reproduction.

In 1977, the federal government placed alligators on the endangered list. They were removed from the endangered list in 1987 and Florida permitted selective hunting in 1988.

In 2013, the US Fish and Wildlife Service was examining a list of nine species to see if they should be added to the protected list. These included bridled darter, Panama City crayfish, Suwanee moccasin shell mussel, eastern hellbender salamander, Florida Keys mole skink, MacGillivray's seaside sparrow, boreal toad, Sierra Nevada red fox, and the Bicknell's thrush.

Invasive species
The state has more invasive amphibians and reptiles than anyplace else in the world. The pet industry was responsible for 84% of the 137 non-native species introduced from 1863 to 2010. 25% were traced to a single importer.

Flora
Approximately 1,300 of Florida's plant species (31 percent of the total) are non-natives which have become established; 10 percent of these are considered invasive.

In 2013, five rare butterflies, indigenous to Florida, haven't been seen in over six years. These include the zestos skipper, rockland Meske's skipper, zarucco duskywing, nickerbean blue, and the Bahamian swallowtail. The US Fish and Wildlife Service is reluctant to declare them extinct because other butterfly species have been "rediscovered" after long periods of not being seen by man.

Hydrilla (Hydrilla verticillata) is the most significant invasive aquatic plant species in the state; aggressive biological, chemical and mechanical management has reduced the effects of water hyacinth (Eichhornia crassipes) and water lettuce (Pistia stratiotes).

Fauna
Due in part to its prevalence in the exotic pet trade, Florida has a large number of non-native species. The Florida Fish and Wildlife Commission tracks 31 species of mammals, 196 species of birds, 48 species of reptiles, 4 species of amphibians, and 55 species of fish that have been observed in the state. Many of the identified species are either non-breeding or stable populations, but several species, including the cane toad (Bufo marinus), Gambian pouched rat (Cricetomys gambianus), Nile monitor (Varanus niloticus), and Burmese python (Python molurus bivittatus), have created significant impact on the delicate ecosystems of the state, especially in the tropical southern third of the state.

Florida's fresh waters are host to 34 confirmed breeding species of exotic (introduced) fish, a higher number than any other place on earth.

Since their accidental importation from South America into North America in the 1930s, the red imported fire ant population has increased its territorial range to include most of the Southern United States, including Florida. They are more aggressive than most native ant species and have a painful sting.

Fungus endangering some non-native palms

Native fusarium wilt is endangering several types of palm trees including the non-native queen palms, and the Washingtonia palms. The fungus is apparently being spread by humans using unsanitized power tools.

Waste in Florida
Florida's 18 million residents (21 million as of 2020) and 80 million visitors generated over  million of solid waste in 2010.

Increasing landfill space has been an issue. In 2010 landfill space cost about $400,000 per .

In 2010, the state had the goal of recycling 75% of its waste by 2020. Municipal experiments in "single-stream recycling" disposal seemed to indicate that this goal might be achievable.

St. Lucie County is planning to experiment with burning trash through plasma arc gamification to generate energy and reduce landfill space.

Pollution and waste
In 2010 there were, in the state, 44 federal Superfund sites, 101 brownfields, 13,527 petroleum cleanups and more than 3,000 other sites with dry-cleaning fluids or other hazardous waste. Drinking water is at risk because the water table is so shallow. 

Phosphorus mining is also an important part of the local economy. Tailing ponds from the mines are vulnerable to breach and contamination of the local environment from the radioactive biproduct called phosphogypsum. In 2021, one of the dams breached at Piney Point phosphate plant into the Tampa Bay.

Because of its marine origins, Florida soil is naturally high in phosphorus. Coupled with fertilizer, this often has resulted in excessive phosphorus in water runoff to nearby bodies of water. As a result, Florida has required certain municipalities to limit the application of fertilizer containing phosphorus.

Climate change

See also

Environmental issues in Brevard County
Environmental Impact of the Big Cypress Swamp Jetport ("Leopold Report" or the "Leopold-Marshall Report"), a report from the Department of the Interior released in 1969
Carl Hiaasen, an author who frequently weaves environmental issues in Florida into his novels

References

External links
Environment Florida - a statewide, citizen-based environmental advocacy organization
Sierra Club Florida - environmental issues

Further reading